Huntsman is an unincorporated community in Cheyenne County, Nebraska, United States.

History
A post office was established at Huntsman in 1919, and remained in operation until it was discontinued in 1934.

References

Unincorporated communities in Cheyenne County, Nebraska
Unincorporated communities in Nebraska